Labrella coryli is an ascomycete fungus. It is a plant pathogen that causes anthracnose on hazelnut.

References

External links 
 Index Fungorum
 USDA ARS Fungal Database

Fungal tree pathogens and diseases
Hazelnut tree diseases
Ascomycota enigmatic taxa